Rzodkiewnica  is a village in the administrative district of Gmina Chorzele, within Przasnysz County, Masovian Voivodeship, in the east-central area of Poland.

References

Rzodkiewnica